Fritz Kominek (15 January 1927 – 25 October 2002) was an Austrian footballer and manager. He played in six matches for the Austria national football team from 1945 to 1953.

References

External links
 

1927 births
2002 deaths
Austrian footballers
Austria international footballers
Place of birth missing
Association footballers not categorized by position
Austrian football managers
1. Wiener Neustädter SC managers
Grazer AK managers
FC Fribourg managers
Austrian expatriate football managers
Expatriate football managers in Switzerland
Austrian expatriate sportspeople in Switzerland